HMS Grampus was a 50-gun fourth-rate ship of the line of the Diomede class of the Royal Navy. She was launched in 1802

Napoleonic Wars
She was commissioned in March 1803 at Portsmouth by Captain Hugh Downman, but in the following month command passed to Captain Thomas Gordon Caulfield. The ship was completed on 11 April 1803 and was ordered to the Downs on 7 May. As soon as her complement of men was completed and her bounty paid she sailed to join Admiral Edward Thornbrough's squadron off Goree.

On 19 May 1803 Jalouse captured Jong Jan Pieter.

Grampus returned to Portsmouth from Guernsey on 20 June to fit out for the East Indies and sailed with a convoy under her protection on 29 June. She carried £100,000 that the British East India Company was shipping to Bengal. On 16 October she was three days out of Rio and in company with the 74-gun third rate ship of the line . The East Indiamen they were escorting were Northampton, Lord Melville, Princess Mary, Anna, Ann, Glory, and Essex. Grampus spent 1805 in the East Indies.

In March 1806 Captain James Haldane Tait took command of Grampus, leaving HMS Sir Francis Drake, while Grampus was employed in India. Later she was stationed at the Cape of Good Hope, and returned home in the summer of 1809, escorting a large convoy of East India Company ships that Captain Tait had taken under his protection at St. Helena. He was presented by the Court of directors with a sum of money for the purchase of a piece of plate. Grampus was paid off because of her poor condition at the end of 1809.

Grampus underwent a repair and refit at Chatham between then and February 1810; in January 1810 she was recommissioned under the command of Captain William Hanwell.

On 28 April 1811 Grampus joined an East India convoy to see them through to the coast of Africa. On 30 September, back at Portsmouth, a court martial was convened on board  in Sheerness harbour to try Lieutenant John Cheshire of Grampus. Captain Hanwell accused him of insolence, contempt, and disrespect on 11 April and similar conduct, coupled with neglect of duty, on 15 April. The court found the charges unfounded and acquitted Lieutenant Cheshire.

In November 1811 Commodore George Cockburn hoisted his broad pendant on board Grampus, preparatory to proceeding as one of three commissioners (the others were Thomas Sydenham and John Philip Morier) nominated by the Prince Regent to mediate between Spain and her colonies. They received final instructions on 2 April 1812, and arrived in Cádiz on 21 April to find the Spanish government and the majority of the Cortes resolved to retain absolute control over their South American possessions instead of taking a liberal view as proposed by the British government. He returned from his unsuccessful mission on 4 August.

Post-war and fate

In 1816 Grampus was taken out of commission at Woolwich, where she was converted to a troopship and then used as a hospital ship at  Deptford from 1820 until being lent to the  Society for Destitute Seamen at Deptford in 1824. She served as a hospital ship until 1831.

Citations and references
Citations

References
 Winfield, Rif. British Warships in the Age of Sail 1793-1817: Design, Construction, Careers and Fates. 2nd edition, Seaforth Publishing, 2008. .
 Winfield, Rif. The 50-Gun Ship: A Complete History. 3rd edition, Mercury Books, 2005. .

External links
 

Ships of the line of the Royal Navy
Hospital ships of the United Kingdom
1802 ships
Ships built in Portsmouth